Cody Brookwell (born September 14, 1986) is a Canadian ice hockey defenceman. He is currently playing for the Belfast Giants in the British Elite Ice Hockey League (EIHL).

Brookwell attended the University of Denver where he played four seasons (2006 – 2010) of NCAA hockey.

In 2010, Brookewell joined the Gwinnett Gladiators of the ECHL, staying with the Gladiators for three seasons.

On June 21, 2013, the Belfast Giants of the British Elite Ice Hockey League signed Brookwell for the 2013-14 season.

References

External links

1986 births
Living people
Canadian ice hockey defencemen
Denver Pioneers men's ice hockey players
Gwinnett Gladiators players
Ice hockey people from Calgary
Vernon Vipers players